The Copa Campeonato del Río de la Plata was an official association football club competition. Unlike Copa Aldao (organised by the Argentine and Uruguayan Associations together), this cup was contested by champions of dissident associations, in this case Asociación Amateurs de Football (AAmF) and Federación Uruguaya de Football (FUF). 

There was only one edition of this competition, held in 1923 in Buenos Aires. The match was played between Argentine club San Lorenzo de Almagro (Argentine Primera División AAmF champion) and Uruguayan club Montevideo Wanderers (Uruguayan Primera División FUF champion).

In the match, played at Gimnasia y Esgrima Stadium in Palermo, Buenos Aires on June 22, 1924, San Lorenzo beat Wanderers 1–0, winning not only the trophy but their first international title.

Qualified teams

Match details

See also
 Copa Aldao

References

a
a
a
1923 in Argentine football
1923 in Uruguayan football
r
r
Football in Buenos Aires